The 2015 ACB Playoffs will be the final phase of the 2014–15 ACB season. They will start on May 28 and will end on June. FC Barcelona is the defending champions.

All times are CEST (UTC+02:00), except the game played in the Canary Islands (WEST, UTC+01:00).

Bracket

Quarterfinals

Real Madrid v Herbalife Gran Canaria

FC Barcelona v FIATC Joventut

Unicaja v Laboral Kutxa Baskonia

Dominion Bilbao Basket v Valencia Basket

Semifinals

Real Madrid v Valencia Basket

FC Barcelona v Unicaja

Finals

References

External links
Official website

Liga ACB playoffs
Playoffs